The Molalla River is a  tributary of the Willamette River in the northwestern part of Oregon in the United States. Flowing northwest from the Cascade Range through Table Rock Wilderness, it passes the city of Molalla before entering the larger river near Canby. The Molalla is the largest Willamette tributary unblocked by a dam.

Course
The river's headwaters are in Clackamas County, near the Table Rock Wilderness, in the Cascade Range. Flowing generally north-northwest from the mountains, the river enters the Willamette Valley and flows past the city of Molalla. It is joined by the Pudding River shortly before entering the Willamette near the city of Canby. The Molalla River is the largest free-flowing tributary of the Willamette.

Named tributaries from source to mouth are Henry, Ogle, Mining Iron, Lake, Scorpion, Hay Barn, Minnette, Dungeon, Avalanche, and Bull creeks, followed by Table Rock Fork. Below that are Horse, Gawley, Cow, Bear, Shotgun, Pine, and Trout creeks followed by the North Fork Molalla River. Then come Russell, Cedar, Dickey, Woodcock, Milk, and Gribble creeks, then the Pudding River.

Discharge

History
During the early 19th century, the area around the river was populated by the Molala people. During that time, an extensive system of trails along the river allowed trade between the peoples of the Willamette Valley and eastern Oregon. As late as the 1920s, the trails were used by Native Americans from the Warm Springs Indian Reservation to reach huckleberry-picking grounds near Table Rock.

Starting in about 1840, European-American settlers began farming in the bottomlands along the lower Molalla. Spurred by passage of the Donation Land Claim Act, the influx continued, and by 1860 there were 75 households in the Molalla area. Wheat was the most common crop, and these early settlers also cultivated potatoes and root vegetables such as turnips and cabbages, and planted apple trees. They fished, hunted, gathered huckleberries, and kept sheep, cows, pigs and chickens.

Gold mining occurred along the Molalla after the discovery of placer gold in 1860. Many claims were filed during the next 40 years. Four mining companies, of which the Ogle Mountain Mining Company was the biggest, had operations in the watershed by the early 20th century. The company operated a mine along Ogle Creek, a Molalla tributary, between 1903 and 1915.

In the 20th century, the watershed became an area of intense logging. Timber companies built forest roads and a spur railroad, set up timber camps, constructed splash dams, and used the river and Milk Creek for transporting logs. Between 1941 and 1945, hundreds of log trucks passed through Molalla every day.

Bridges

This is a list of bridges and other crossings of the Molalla River from its confluence with the Willamette River upstream to its source in the Cascade Range.

Knight's Bridge
Knight's Bridge was a wooden covered bridge built in 1877 over the Molalla River on the western city limit of Canby. The bridge was destroyed in 1947. In 1964, a steel bridge with a concrete deck replaced the former crossing.

Recreation

Parks
Used mainly for recreation by local residents, its attractions include fishing, boating, water-skiing, picnicking, and wildlife viewing. It has a  nature trail, restrooms, a boat launch, and an area for flying radio-controlled aircraft. Among its features is a rookery for great blue herons, among the largest in the Willamette Valley.

It has 20 sites for camping in tents or recreational vehicles (RV)s, all supplied with water and electric hook-ups. Other amenities include picnic tables, horseshoe pits, and access to fishing.

Hiking
Overseen by the Bureau of Land Management, it has four trailheads—Table Rock, Old Bridge, Rooster Rock, and Bull Creek—linked to a  network of hiking and horse-riding trails.

Boating
Whitewater enthusiasts sometimes run the upper reaches of the Molalla River as well as the lower. Under certain conditions, the  stretch from Copper Creek to Table Rock Fork can be navigated by boaters capable of handling technical class III (intermediate) to IV (advanced) water on the International Scale of River Difficulty. Hazards on these upper miles may include narrow chutes, sudden drops, and logs in the water. The next , Turner Bridge to Glen Avon Bridge, are rated technical class III to IV with hazards similar to the upper reaches but also including scouting difficulties as well as a dangerous undercut at a rapids called Goldilocks.

The lower reaches are much gentler. The  run from Glen Avon Bridge to Freyer Park is rated class II (novice). Here the most difficult rapids occur in the first half of the run. Below that come  of class I (beginner) water from Freyer Park to the Oregon 213 Bridge.

Fishing
The river supports populations of smallmouth bass near the confluence with the Willamette River and of wild cutthroat trout in the upper reaches and tributaries. Trout fishing is limited to catch and release as is angling for wild steelhead or Chinook salmon, which also frequent the Molalla.

See also
List of rivers of Oregon
List of longest streams of Oregon

References

External links
Molalla River Watershed Analysis – Bureau of Land Management
Photo of Knight's Bridge – Oregon Historic Photograph Collections

Tributaries of the Willamette River
Rivers of Clackamas County, Oregon
Rivers of Oregon
Wild and Scenic Rivers of the United States
Oregon placenames of Native American origin